Gregg Andrew Rainwater (born February 27, 1966) is an American actor of Osage, Cherokee, Irish, and Filipino descent, who is best known for his roles as half-Kiowa Buck Cross on The Young Riders (1989–1992) and T. Hawk in Street Fighter (1994).

He later starred in Ocean Tribe, guest-starred on Walker, Texas Ranger and Promised Land, and has done a lot of voice work, including Pocahontas II: Journey to a New World, Justice League Unlimited, Gargoyles, and Young Justice. He has also worked three seasons as an art director for America's Got Talent, and in April 2010 worked as Art Director on "American Idol - Idol Gives Back", for which he was nominated for a Primetime Emmy Award. Rainwater is a singer as well, and has toured England with the Warren Youth Chorale.

Filmography

Audio books

References

External links 
 
 The Buck Stop

1966 births
Living people
American male film actors
American people of Cherokee descent
American male actors of Filipino descent
American people of Irish descent
American people of Osage descent
American male television actors
Actors from Flint, Michigan
Male actors from Michigan